is a shooter game developed by Grasshopper Manufacture and published by Level-5. It was originally included in the Guild01 compilation for the Nintendo 3DS in 2012, and later made available separately on Nintendo eShop. A stand-alone high definition version was also released for the iOS in 2013.

Gameplay
The player flies Kamui into the map and the Touch Screen is used to fire missiles or lasers at enemies. At the end of each stage exists a Spike which can be revealed by firing missiles or lasers around its location. They are considered bosses and its thick armor can be pierced using a special technique that requires rapidly drawing circles on the Touch Screen.

Plot

An invading country is stealing all of Japan's energy. The player controls Shoko (voiced by Kana Hanazawa), a high school girl who became President of New Japan after her father's assassination, as she enters the mecha Kamui to fight back.

Development and release
Liberation Maiden was result of its creative director Goichi Suda's interest in developing for the Nintendo 3DS, which dates back to before the release of the console. It features animated cutscenes created by Studio BONES and the main theme song, performed by Marina. Liberation Maiden shares stylistic traits with other material from Grasshopper Manufacture's repertoire, particularly Pure White Lover Bizarre Jelly, an in-game anime within the No More Heroes universe.

The game was released in Europe on October 4, 2012, in North America on October 25, 2012, and individually in Japan on November 14, 2012. A later high-definition version was released internationally for the iOS systems on March 7, 2013.

Reception

In Japan, Liberation Maiden was released as part of Guild01. It has received mostly positive or average reviews on 3DS, but it has sold poorly. In the west, Liberation Maiden also received mostly positive or average reviews on both platforms.

Sequel
A visual novel sequel to the game, titled Liberation Maiden SIN, was developed by 5pb. for the PlayStation 3 on December 5, 2013. A PlayStation Vita version was later released on July 31, 2014. Both versions have not been released outside of Japan.

Notes

References

External links
Liberation Maiden official website
Liberation Maiden SIN official website 
Liberation Maiden at MobyGames

Guild (video game series)
2012 video games
Bones (studio)
Grasshopper Manufacture games
IOS games
Level-5 (company) franchises
Level-5 (company) games
Nintendo 3DS eShop games
Nintendo 3DS games
Science fiction video games
Shoot 'em ups
Single-player video games
Video game franchises
Video games developed in Japan 
Video games featuring female protagonists
Video games scored by Akira Yamaoka
Video games set in Japan
Video games set in the 22nd century